Evald Aav ( – 21 March 1939) was an Estonian composer born in Tallinn, Governorate of Estonia, Russian Empire. He studied music composition there with Artur Kapp and wrote primarily vocal music to words in the Estonian language. In 1928 he composed the first national Estonian opera, Vikerlased (The Vikings). The opera premiered in Tallinn on 8 September 1928. He modelled his style of composition after Tchaikovsky.

Aav was married to opera singer Ida Loo-Talvari from 1926 until 1937 when the couple divorced.

References

External links
  Evald Aav at the Estonian Music Information Centre

1900 births
1939 deaths
Musicians from Tallinn
People from the Governorate of Estonia
Estonian opera composers
Burials at Metsakalmistu
20th-century Estonian musicians
Estonian choral conductors
20th-century Estonian composers
20th-century conductors (music)
20th-century classical composers
Male classical composers
Estonian Academy of Music and Theatre alumni
20th-century Estonian male musicians